Moe Segal was a Grey Cup champion Canadian Football League player. He played offensive guard and tackle.

A native Québécois, Segal played football with Ottawa Technical High School. He won the Grey Cup with the champion St. Hyacinthe-Donnacona Navy team in 1944 (unfortunately Segal was injured just before the championship game and did not get to play.) He played with the Ottawa Rough Riders in 1946 and the Ottawa Trojans in 1947.

References

1925 births
People from Outaouais
Ottawa Rough Riders players
Ontario Rugby Football Union players
2016 deaths
Players of Canadian football from Quebec
St. Hyacinthe-Donnacona Navy football players